This is a list of present and extant viscounts in the peerage of the Kingdom of Spain hold by people with Spanish citizenship.

Note that some of the titles are only used as subsidiary titles.

This list does not include extinct, dormant, abeyant, forfeited or titles of which their holder is not known.

Viscounts in the peerage of Spain

See also
Spanish nobility
List of dukes in the peerage of Spain
List of barons in the peerage of Spain
List of lords in the peerage of Spain

Bibliography

Notes and references

External links
Consejo de la Grandeza de España: Title guide

  
Viscountcies
Viscountcies
Spanish noble titles